Delta House is an American sitcom that was adapted from the 1978 film National Lampoon's Animal House. The series aired from January 18 to April 21, 1979 on ABC.

Casting
Cast members reprising their roles from Animal House included John Vernon (Dean Wormer), Stephen Furst (Flounder), Bruce McGill (D-Day), and James Widdoes (Hoover).
Priscilla Lauris, who played Dean Wormer's secretary in the movie, also returned to reprise her role, and her character was given a name (Miss Leonard).
Josh Mostel was cast as Jim "Blotto" Blutarsky, brother of Bluto, the character played in the film by John Belushi. Despite Bluto's absence (it is revealed in the pilot episode that he was expelled from college, and had been drafted into the U.S. Army), the scriptwriters made running references to his character throughout the series. In one episode, Blotto announced that he had received a letter from his brother Bluto, prompting a Delta brother to respond "I didn't know Bluto could write," and another Delta brother to riposte, "I didn't know Blotto could read!"

Delta House also served as an early vehicle for Michelle Pfeiffer, who played "The Bombshell". She appeared in all of the episodes, with the exception of the pilot. She referred to the show as good exposure and a foot in the door. The series did not last, but she was noticed by a lot of Hollywood executives and her career picked up and she became a star soon after.

Production and scheduling problems
Because of television Standards and Practices, most of the raunchy humor, sexual references, and foul language featured in Animal House did not survive the transition to TV. As a result, Delta House suffered in comparison. That it aired during the so-called "family hour" (8:00 PM on Saturday nights) led to even more watering down.

In addition, the other two broadcast networks rushed onto the airwaves their own sitcoms that were "inspired" by Animal House: NBC's Brothers and Sisters and CBS' Co-Ed Fever.

Delta House initially did well in the ratings. However, executive producers Matty Simmons and Ivan Reitman's constant fights with ABC over content led the network to cancel the show after 13 episodes.

Theme song
The theme song was written by Jim Steinman to lyrics written by Lampoon editors Tony Hendra and Sean Kelly. Steinman later reworked the melody into the song "Dead Ringer for Love", made famous by Meat Loaf and Cher from the album Dead Ringer, and a portion of the lyrics into the song "Tonight Is What It Means to Be Young" from the movie Streets of Fire (incidentally, Meat Loaf had been an alternate choice for the role of Bluto in Animal House had John Belushi dropped out).

In the episode "Campus Fair", the song "Pizza Man" was performed during a beauty pageant talent showcase. It was taken from National Lampoon's Off-Broadway sketch revue Lemmings, a send-up of the Woodstock Festival, where it was originally sung by actress Alice Playten.

Cast
 John Vernon as Dean Vernon Wormer, the corrupt dean of Faber College and the main nemesis of the Delta Fraternity.
 Stephen Furst as Kent "Flounder" Dorfman, an overweight and dim-witted freshman member of the Delta House.
 Bruce McGill as Daniel Simpson Day a.k.a. "D-Day," a motorcycle-riding member of the Delta House.
 James Widdoes as Robert Hoover, the strait-laced president of the Delta House.
 Josh Mostel as Jim "Blotto" Blutarsky, a transfer student and the newest member of the Delta House who takes after his older brother, John "Bluto" Blutarsky.
 Richard Seer as Larry "Pinto" Kroger, a freshman member of the Delta House and a close friend of Flounder. The role was originally played by Thomas Hulce in the feature film Animal House.
 Peter Fox as Eric "Otter" Stratton, a charismatic ladies man and a member of the Delta House. The role was originally played by Tim Matheson in Animal House.
 Gary Cookson as Douglas C. Neidermeyer, the sergeant-at-arms of the rival Omega House. The role was originally played by Mark Metcalf in Animal House.
 Susanna Dalton as Mandy Pepperidge, a cheerleader and an ally of the Omega House. The role was originally played by Mary Louise Weller in Animal House.
 Wendy Goldman as Muffy Jones, a friend of the Deltas and the girlfriend of Pinto.
 Brian Patrick Clarke as Greg Marmalard, the president of the rival Omega House. The role was originally played by James Daughton in Animal House.
 Lee Wilkof as A. S. Einswine, a member of the Delta House who deals in fabricated term papers and other shady businesses on behalf of the Deltas.
 Peter Kastner as Prof. Dave Jennings, a professor at Faber. The role was originally played by Donald Sutherland in Animal House.
 Michelle Pfeiffer as The Bombshell, an attractive anthropology student and a friend of the Deltas.

Episodes

References

External links

1979 American television series debuts
1979 American television series endings
1970s American sitcoms
American Broadcasting Company original programming
1970s American college television series
English-language television shows
Television series set in the 1960s
Period television series
Live action television shows based on films
Television series by Universal Television
Television shows set in San Francisco